Schizothorax waltoni is a species of ray-finned fish in the genus Schizothorax from the Brahmaputra River in Tibet.

References 

Schizothorax
Fish described in 1905